Qingdao Metro is a rapid transit system in Qingdao, Shandong province, China. The first line, Line 3 (north section) began operation on December 16, 2015.

Lines in operation

Line 1

The northern section between Qingdao North Railway Station and Dongguozhuang Station was opened on 24 December 2020. The southern section between  Qingdao North Railway Station and Wangjiagang Station was opened on 30 December 2021. Line 1's color is yellow.

Line 2

Line 2 began passenger service on December 10, 2017, between Zhiquan Road station and Licun Park station. The western section from Zhiquan Road station to Taishan Road station opened on December 16, 2019. Line 2's color is red.

Line 3

The construction of the first line, Line 3, began on November 30, 2009. The northern half of Line 3 began trial passenger operation on December 16, 2015, and the southern half opened a year later, on December 18, 2016. Line 3's color is blue.

Line 4 

Line 4's color is green.

Line 8

The northern section opened in December 2020, and the southern section is currently under construction. Line 8's color is pink.

Line 11

Line 11's color is dark blue.

Line 13

Line 13's color is teal.

History 
Qingdao proposed a subway system in 1935, making it one of the first cities in China to propose a subway system. The proposed network was 42 km long and ran underground in the city center while elevated in the suburbs. However, the plan never gained traction due to turmoil from the Second Sino-Japanese War and Chinese Civil War. Planning resumed in 1989 only to be stopped again in 1995 after a national suspension of subway projects was declared due to worries of high costs and financial debts. Repeated attempts to gain approval for subway construction were unsuccessful until 2009 when it was finally approved by the NDRC and a test section of Line 3 started construction in July.

Short-term plan

Phase 2 construction plan
The Phase 2 construction plan (2013-2021) of Qingdao Metro was approved by National Development and Reform Commission in April 2016.

More transfer stations such as Taidong station and Liaoyang East Road station will be built, providing the citizens with more choices in transportation.

Line 2 (Western Extension)
A  extension from Taishan Road to Lundu (Ferry Terminal) started construction on October 26, 2019.

Line 6
Construction for Line 6 Phase I started on December 16, 2019. Line 6 is a  line with 21 underground stations.

Line 8 (South Section) 
The remaining Line 8 southern section brings Line 8 deeper into the urban districts of Qingdao and is planned to open by the end of 2025.

Line 13 (North Section) 

Phase 3 construction plan
The Phase 3 construction plan (2021-2026) of Qingdao Metro was approved by National Development and Reform Commission on August 19, 2021.

Network map

See also
 List of metro systems

References

 $4.3 billion budget to boost Qingdao subway construction

External links

 Qingdao Metro construction 
 Qingdao Metro construction presentation 
 Qingdao at UrbanRail.net

 
Rail transport in Shandong
Rapid transit in China
2015 establishments in China
Railway lines opened in 2015
Projects established in 1935